Lawrence Kimberley (born 1962) has been Dean of Christchurch since 2015.

Kimberley was previously an accountant. He was Curate at Church of St Michael and All Angels, Christchurch then Vicar of Heathcote- Mount Pleasant. He was Archdeacon of Pegasus from 2006 to 2014. He was then Vicar of St Martin, Opawa until his appointment to the Deanery.

References

1962 births
Archdeacons of Pegasus
Deans of Christchurch
Living people
New Zealand accountants